West Launceston is a residential locality in the local government area (LGA) of Launceston in the Launceston LGA region of Tasmania. The 2016 census recorded a population of 4212 for the state suburb of West Launceston.
The suburb is part of the Launceston CBD and is also near Cataract Gorge.

About 2% of the population is indigenous peoples and 18% are foreign born. Approximately 7% of employees work in hospitals, with restaurants and education also being significant employers.

History 
West Launceston was gazetted as a locality in 1963.

Geography
The South Esk River forms the north-western boundary.

Road infrastructure 
National Route 1 (Midland Highway) passes to the east. From there, various streets provide access to the locality.

References

Suburbs of Launceston, Tasmania
Localities of City of Launceston